The New York Academy of Sciences (originally the Lyceum of Natural History) was founded in January 1817 as the Lyceum of Natural History. It is the fourth oldest scientific society in the United States. An independent, nonprofit organization with more than  members in 100 countries, the academy has a mission to advance scientific research and knowledge, support scientific literacy, and promote science-based solutions to global challenges. The academy hosts programs and publishes scholarly scientific content in the life, physical, and social sciences, including several areas of cross-discipline inquiry such as nutrition, artificial intelligence, space exploration, and sustainability. The academy's programs and publications are designed to discuss and disseminate accurate and timely scientific information to its members, the broad scientific community, the media, and the public. The academy also provides professional and educational resources for researchers across all phases of their careers. The president and CEO of the academy is Nicholas Dirks. The chair of the board of governors is Jerry Hultin, chair and co-founder of Global Futures Group, LLC.

Brief History
Founded on January 29, 1817, the New York Academy of Sciences was originally called the Lyceum of Natural History. Attended by the academy's founder and first president, Samuel L. Mitchill, the first meeting of the Lyceum took place at the College of Physicians and Surgeons, located on Barclay Street near Broadway in lower Manhattan. Within a few months of the first meeting, the Lyceum moved to the New York Institution (located on the northwest corner of Broadway and Chambers Street) and began its first activities—hosting lectures, collecting natural history specimens, and establishing a library. In 1823, the Lyceum began publishing its own scientific journal, Annals of the Lyceum of Natural History of New York, which, in 1876, was renamed Annals of the New York Academy of Sciences. By 1826 the Lyceum owned "the richest collection of reptiles and fish in the country." A fire in 1866 destroyed the collection. Following the fire, the academy turned its focus away from collecting and natural history to the ever-specializing domains of scientific research and inquiry, community outreach, and involvement in the scientific endeavors of the main scientific organizations in New York City. This included the dissemination of scientific information at all levels—from a curious public to specialized science societies, colleges, and universities. 

From the outset, the New York Academy of Sciences' membership was unusual among scientific societies in the 19th century because its democratic structure allowed all to join, from laypeople to professional scientists, clinicians, and engineers. For that reason, the membership has always included a mix of scientists, business people, academics, government workers, and members of the general public.  Prominent members have included United States Presidents (Thomas Jefferson and James Monroe), as well as many notable scientists and scholars, including Asa Gray (who served as the superintendent of the academy starting in 1836), John James Audubon, Alexander Graham Bell, Thomas Edison, Louis Pasteur, Charles Darwin,  Nicholas Tesla, Margaret Mead (who served for a time as the vice president of the academy), Rosalyn Yalow, Elizabeth Blackburn, and Jennifer Dudna. Prior to 1877, the academy only admitted men, but on November 5, 1877, it elected Erminnie A. Smith the first female member. Members, Honorary Members, Corresponding Members, and Fellows have included many renowned scientists—including dozens of Nobel Prize laureates over the over the years.

Early Academy members played prominent roles in the establishment of New York University in 1831 and the American Museum of Natural History in 1869, and the New York Botanical Garden.

The academy's programs and publications have contributed significantly to scientific discussions and progress over its history, including: in 1876, publishing one of the first studies on environmental pollution; conducting the first-of-its-kind scientific survey and publication The Scientific Survey of Puerto Rico and the Virgin Islands, from 1907 to 1934; holding the first conference and publication of key papers on antibiotics in 1945–46; hosting a conference and publishing key papers on the cardiovascular effects of smoking in 1960 and on the effects of asbestos on human health in 1964–65; founding the Women in Science Committee in 1977; convening the world's first major scientific conference on AIDS in 1983–1984; and an early conference on SARS in 2003.

More recent activities have included: annual meetings on machine learning; programs designed to reduce time and costs of Alzheimer's research; programs on the development of the brain from before birth through early childhood; convening the inaugural Summit on Science Enablement for the (United Nations) Sustainable Development Goals in 2017; and convening climate scientists and city planners, industry experts, policymakers, and representatives of NGOs for a conference marking the 10-year anniversary of a partnership between the New York City Panel on Climate Change, the City of New York, and Annals of the New York Academy of Sciences. The journal published three volumes (in 2010, 2015, and 2019) of scientific studies on climate change in NYC.

Like most scientific organizations in early 2020, the academy turned resources to programming related to the COVID-19 pandemic, producing over 35 programs on the science of SARS-CoV-2, developments in vaccines and therapies, and lessons on how to prepare for future outbreaks.

Publications
Annals of the New York Academy of Sciences (first published as Annals of the Lyceum of Natural History in 1823) is one of the oldest continuously published scientific journals in the United States.  Annals is an international science journal published monthly in many areas of science, though predominantly the biological sciences. Each issue presents original research articles and/or commissioned review, commentary, and perspective articles. Annals is a hybrid journal—i.e., it is available by subscription from John Wiley & Sons and over 30% of individual papers are freely available via Creative Commons licenses. The journal is rigorously peer-reviewed, and is currently ranked 2020 13 out of 73 journals in the Multidisciplinary Sciences category by the 2020 Journal Citation Reports™ (Clarivate Analytics).

Transactions of the New York Academy of Sciences is an historical publication of the academy. Published as two series (Series 1, volumes 1–16, 1881–1897, and Series 2, volumes 1–41, 1938–1983), Transactions presents scholarly and scientific proceedings of the various Academy scientific “Sections” (e.g., Section of Anthropology, Biology, Physics and Chemistry, Oceanography and Meteorology, Mathematics and Engineering, Geology and Mineralogy, and several others) and of other scientific events and proceedings at the academy. A sister journal to Annals of the New York Academy of Sciences is Transactions, which provides a window on Academy scientific proceedings that cannot be found elsewhere, and thus is a rich history of science in the nineteenth and twentieth centuries.

The Sciences was a popular science magazine published by the academy from 1961 to 2001.  It bridged the sciences and culture, winning seven National Magazine Awards.

Over the past 15 years, these seminal publications, as well as the academy's archive, were digitized.

Programs
Frontiers of Science 

The New York Academy of Sciences produces domestic and international conferences, convened in-person and virtually, that cover cutting-edge, cross-disciplinary topics including genomic medicine, chemical and structural biology, drug discovery, computer science, and urban sustainability.  The academy's Frontiers of Science programs provide a neutral forum for participants to exchange information on basic and applied research and to discuss the broader role of science, medicine, and technology in society. In addition to programming related to the COVID-19 pandemic, recent conferences have also explored conflicts of interest in the health sciences and medicine, racial bias in science and academia, science denialism, issues in bioethics and law in space travel, and profiles of women in the top echelons of science.

The Global STEM Alliance and the Junior Academy

The Global STEM Alliance equips thousands of students each year with skills and provides role models to support them on educational paths toward STEM careers. The Alliance offers challenge competitions, supports teachers with professional development, and trains STEM professionals to serve as mentors. The Junior Academy is a community under the New York Academy of the Sciences that aims to connect students ages 13 to 17. Each year, 1,000 students from around the world are selected to be a part of the program and compete in 10-week long challenges.

The Science Alliance

The Science Alliance supports early-career researchers, providing entrepreneurial opportunities, platforms for cross-cultural personal and professional networking, and learning resources.

Nutrition Program

The New York Academy of Sciences’ Nutrition Science Program supports maternal and child nutrition, and provides leadership in food safety, food security, and the drive to end micronutrient deficiencies.

International Science Reserve

The International Science Reserve (ISR) includes members who provide resources (e.g., genomic sequencing, specialized talent, labs, databases, high performance computing), advice, and support. It is governed by a board of leaders in industry, government, academia, and non-governmental organizations. Partners include IBM, Google, and UL.

The Interstellar Initiative

The Interstellar Initiative, a program developed with the Japan Agency for Medical Research and Development, fosters international and interdisciplinary collaboration between scientists early in their careers. With the guidance of leading senior researchers, teams develop research plans and grant proposals centered in the life sciences. Since 2017, the Interstellar Initiative has supported over 170 early-career scientists and 41 senior scientists as mentors.

Awards 
The Blavatnik Awards for Young Scientists were established in 2007 by the Blavatnik Family Foundation.  The awards, administered by the academy,  are given each year, to early-career scientists in the New York region (New York, New Jersey, and Connecticut), across the U.S., in the U.K., and in Israel. By the close of 2022, the Blavatnik Awards will have recognized more than 370 young scientists and engineers from 47 countries, and awarded unrestricted cash prizes totaling US$13.6M.

Established in 2016, the Innovators in Science Award, administered by the academy and sponsored by Takeda Pharmaceuticals, honors both a promising early-career scientist and an outstanding senior scientist for exceptional research contributions in rotating fields of biomedicine. The winners each receive a US$200,000 prize, intended to support their commitment to innovative research.

References

Bibliography
 Douglas Sloan, "Science in New York City, 1867-1907," Isis 71 (March 1980), pp. 35–76.
 Simon Baatz, Knowledge, Culture, and Science in the Metropolis: The New York Academy of Sciences, 1817–1970, Annals of the New York Academy of Sciences, New York, NY, 1990, Volume 584
 "For Science Academy, Move to World Trade Center Is Like Going Home," The New York Times, October 30, 2006

External links

Scientific societies based in the United States
Education in New York City
Organizations based in New York City
1817 establishments in New York (state)
Organizations established in 1817
Science and technology in New York City
Charities based in New York City